Events from the year 1966 in Denmark.

Incumbents
 Monarch – Frederick IX
 Prime minister – Jens Otto Krag

Events

Births
 25 January – Heinz Ehlers, professional ice hockey coach and former ice hockey player 
 18 May – Peter Juel-Jensen, politician 
 14 December – Helle Thorning-Schmidt, politician, leader of Socialdemokraterne
Date unknown
 Henrik Capetillo, Danish artist born in Sweden

Deaths
 26 February – Karl Jørgensen, actor (b. 1890)
 18 March – Osvald Helmuth, actor and singer (b. 1894)
 24 April – Hans Christian Branner, writer (b. 1903)
 14 May – Oluf Høst, painter (b. 1883)
 3 July – Eleanor Margaret Green, Princess Viggo, Countess of Rosenborg (born 1895 in USA)

See also
1966 in Danish television

References

 
Denmark
Years of the 20th century in Denmark
1960s in Denmark
Denmark